Qazançı or Gazanchy may refer to:

Qazançı, Agdam, Azerbaijan
Qazançı, Goranboy, Azerbaijan
Qazançı, Nakhchivan, Azerbaijan
Qazançı, Zangilan, Azerbaijan

See also
Kazanchi (disambiguation)